Innocent Lotocky O.S.B.M (November 3, 1915 – July 4, 2013) was an American Bishop of the Ukrainian Catholic Church. Prior to his consecration as bishop, he served for many years as pastor of Immaculate Conception Ukrainian Catholic Church in Hamtramck, Michigan.

Life 
Lotocky was born in Stari Petlykivtsi in present-day Ukraine. In November 24, 1940, he was ordained as a priest in the Religious Order of Saint Basil the Great. From 1962 to 1980, he served as Pastor of Immaculate Conception Ukrainian Catholic Church in Hamtramck. He was appointed to the  Ukrainian Catholic Eparchy of Chicago on December 22, 1980, and ordained as Bishop Innocent on March 22, 1981. Lotocky remained at the Ukrainian Catholic Eparchy of Chicago until July 2, 1993.

On June 29, 2013, after difficulty breathing, Bishop Innocent was taken to hospital. His condition deteriorated, and he died peacefully in Presence St. Mary Medical Center in Chicago, Illinois, on July 4, 2013.

See also
Ukrainian Catholic Eparchy of Chicago
Ukrainian Greek Catholic Church

References

External links
Catholic-Hierarchy
Diocese Website

American Eastern Catholic bishops
Ukrainian emigrants to the United States
Bishops of the Ukrainian Greek Catholic Church
Order of Saint Basil the Great
Ukrainian Austro-Hungarians
People from the Kingdom of Galicia and Lodomeria
1915 births
2013 deaths